Liberalism and the Limits of Justice (1982; second edition 1998) is a book about liberalism by the philosopher Michael Sandel. The work helped start the liberalism-communitarianism debate that dominated Anglo-American political philosophy in the 1980s.

Summary

Sandel discusses liberalism, the work of the philosopher Immanuel Kant, and utilitarianism. He criticizes the philosopher John Rawls, evaluating his ideas as advanced in A Theory of Justice (1971), Political Liberalism (1993), and other works. He also criticizes the philosopher Robert Nozick, and his ideas as advanced in Anarchy, State, and Utopia (1974).

Publication history
Liberalism and the Limits of Justice was first published in 1982 by Cambridge University Press. In 1998, Cambridge University Press published a second edition.

Reception
Liberalism and the Limits of Justice received a positive review from Mark Sagoff in the Yale Law Journal. Sagoff endorsed Sandel's "criticism of contemporary utilitarian and Kantian conceptions of the good". He expressed agreement with Sandel's views of liberalism and the nature of the self. He also agreed with Sandel's criticisms of Rawls's view of the origins of the principles of justice and of "the idea of a social contract dependent on possessive individualism." He compared Sandel's views to those of the philosophers F. H. Bradley, Thomas Hill Green, and Bernard Bosanquet, but believed that his work was open to criticism in that it did not advance sufficiently beyond them and left some questions unresolved.

The philosopher Sheldon Wolin called the book "the best political critique of Rawls from a communitarian and participatory perspective." The philosopher Richard Rorty described the book as "clear and forceful". He credited Sandel with providing "very elegant and cogent arguments against the attempt to use a certain conception of the self, a certain metaphysical view of what human beings are like, to legitimize liberal politics." The philosopher Jonathan Wolff wrote that Sandel provides the fullest development of the argument that Rawls bases his political philosophy on an untenable metaphysics of the self. The philosopher Will Kymlicka wrote that Liberalism and the Limits of Justice is Sandel's best-known book, and helped start the liberalism-communitarianism debate that dominated Anglo-American political philosophy in the 1980s.

References

Bibliography
Books

 
 
 
 
 

Journals

External links
 Mark Sagoff, "Review: The Limits of Justice" Yale Law Journal May, 1983
 Daniel Bell, "Communitarianism" Stanford Encyclopedia of Philosophy 2012

1982 non-fiction books
American non-fiction books
American political books
Books about liberalism
Books in political philosophy
Cambridge University Press books
English-language books
Works by Michael J. Sandel